Backbone is an album by the rock band Backbone.  Their only album, it was released by Grateful Dead Records on January 13, 1998.  It contains ten original songs, plus a version of the Grateful Dead tune "New Speedway Boogie".

Backbone was a trio of Rick Barnett on guitar, Edd Cook on bass, and former Grateful Dead member Bill Kreutzmann on drums  Their music was heavily influenced by blues and R&B, and included substantial amounts of improvisational jamming.

Track listing 
 "Preserve the Blues" (Rick Barnett) – 4:34
 "Sittin' Here Thinkin'" (Barnett, Philbrick) – 3:03
 "Make Me Laugh" (Barnett) – 6:27
 "Breathe Deeply" (Barnett) – 4:42
 "Nothing's Different" (Edd Cook) – 3:26
 "Fly Away" (Barnett, Bill Kreutzmann, Cook) – 4:10
 "Only Son" (Barnett, Kreutzmann, Brandon) – 5:51
 "New Speedway Boogie" (Jerry Garcia, Robert Hunter) – 5:47
 "Stayed Away Too Long" (Barnett) – 4:12
 "Earthchild (Barnett, Kreutzmann) – 3:45
 "Ocean Laughter" (Barnett, Kreutzmann, Becker) – 4:52

Personnel

Backbone 
 Rick Barnett – guitar, vocals
 Edd Cook – bass, saxophone, vocals
 Bill Kreutzmann – drums

Additional musicians 
 Janice Barnett – background vocals
 Michael Ruff – Hammond organ, piano
 Bruce Harris – Hammond organ
 Nadia Deleye – background vocals on "New Speedway Boogie"

Production 
 Rick Barnett – producer, recording
 Casey Jones – second engineer
 John Cutler – mixing
 Jeffrey Norman – mixing
 Joe Gastwirt – mastering
 Steve Parish – crew
 Billy Grillo – crew
 Ken Friedman – photography
 John Werner – photography
 Todd Michael – photography
 Amy Finkle – package design

References 

Bill Kreutzmann albums
1998 albums
Grateful Dead Records albums
Blues rock albums by American artists